Tune Up! is an album by organist Don Patterson featuring tracks recorded in 1964 and 1969 which was released by Prestige in 1971. The album features unreleased recordings from the sessions that also produced Hip Cake Walk, Patterson's People, Oh Happy Day, Brothers-4 and Donny Brook.

Track listing 
All compositions by Don Patterson except as noted
 "Just Friends" (John Klenner, Sam M. Lewis) - 5:55   
 "Flyin' Home" (Lionel Hampton, Benny Goodman) - 10:20      
 "Tune Up" (Miles Davis) - 4:28   
 "Blues for Mom" - 12:50  
 Recorded at Van Gelder Studio in Englewood Cliffs, New Jersey on July 10, 1964 (track 1), August 25, 1964 (track 2), June 2, 1969 (track 4) and September 15, 1969 (track 3)

Personnel 
 Don Patterson - organ
 Virgil Jones - trumpet (track 4)
 George Coleman (track 4), Booker Ervin (tracks 1 & 2), Houston Person (track 4), Sonny Stitt (tracks 2 & 3) - tenor saxophone 
 Grant Green - guitar (track 3)
 Billy James (tracks 1–3), Frankie Jones (track 4) - drums

References 

Don Patterson (organist) albums
1971 albums
Prestige Records albums
Albums produced by Bob Porter (record producer)
Albums produced by Ozzie Cadena
Albums recorded at Van Gelder Studio